Calhoun is an unincorporated community in Lincoln County, Arkansas, United States.

References

Unincorporated communities in Lincoln County, Arkansas
Unincorporated communities in Arkansas